Below are the rosters for the EFA European Under-16 Football Championship 1998 tournament in Scotland.

Group A

Head coach:

Head coach:

Head coach:

Head coach:

Group B

Head coach:

Head coach:

Head coach:

Head coach:

Group C

IRELAND
Head coach:Brian Karr

Head coach: Brian Kerr

Head coach:

Head coach:

Group D

Head coach:

Head coach:

Head coach: Aleksandr Kuznetsov

Head coach:

1998 UEFA European Under-16 Championship
UEFA European Under-17 Championship squads